Uzhaippali Makkal Katchi is a political party in Indian state of Tamil Nadu.

References

Political parties in Tamil Nadu
Political parties with year of establishment missing